Saint Barnabas Greek Orthodox Church is a Greek Orthodox church in Finsbury Road, Wood Green, London.

References

External links 

Wood Green
Churches in the London Borough of Haringey
Greek Orthodox churches in the United Kingdom